Night Will Fall is a 2014 documentary film directed by Andre Singer that chronicles the making of the 1945 British government documentary German Concentration Camps Factual Survey. The 1945 documentary, which showed gruesome scenes from newly liberated Nazi concentration camps, languished in British archives for nearly seven decades and was only recently completed.

The 1945 documentary, based on the work of combat cameramen serving with the armed forces and newsreel footage, was produced by Sidney Bernstein, then a British government official, with participation by Alfred Hitchcock. About 12 minutes of footage in this 75-minute film is from the earlier documentary.

The title of the film was derived from a line of narration in the 1945 documentary: "Unless the world learns the lesson these pictures teach, night will fall."

Synopsis

The film explores the importance of film as a new medium for documenting warfare; it was just beginning to be used in 1944 and 1945, when the Allies liberated the prison, labor and extermination camps run by the Nazis and their allies in Germany and eastern Europe. This film draws from historic footage for German Concentration Camps Factual Survey, a 1945 British documentary, with recent interviews with survivors and liberators. The producers, editors and cameramen who produced the 1945 documentary are featured, and its long delay from release is explored.

As the film begins, British forces liberate the Bergen-Belsen concentration camp. They took the camp commander, Josef Kramer, and the camp guards as POWs, later forcing them to aid in burial of the masses of dead, whose bodies had been left on the ground all around the camp. Other camps are shown being liberated, including Auschwitz and Majdanek in Poland. The latter camps are shown by footage shot by Soviet cameramen. When Westerners first saw such footage, they suspected that the Soviets had produced atrocity propaganda, as had been the case in some instances. The Allies forced civilians from nearby towns and German servicemen to tour the camps, in order to acknowledge what had taken place under their government and in their neighborhood. They were forced to see the piles of persons who died from starvation, torture and disease; partially burned remains in the crematoria; gruesome displays, including shrunken skulls, and bales of hair, piles of clothing, children's toys, and eyeglasses.

Survivors such as Anita Lasker-Wallfisch were interviewed for this film. Eva Mozes Kor tells about the sight of soldiers in white camouflage uniforms, liberating the camp while it snowed, and the soldiers giving prisoners chocolate, cookies and hugs.

Among the interviewed survivors is Branko Lustig, producer of Schindler's List, who speaks of having heard the unearthly music of bagpipes when the camp was liberated. Apparently British forces were led by Scots playing the pipes. At the time, Lustig was so weak he could not raise his body to look out the window, and he thought that he was about to die or was already dead, and that this was the music of angels about which he had heard. Editing was nearly complete on the 1945 documentary when the British government decided to shelve it. Lustig theorizes that the 1945 work was shelved for political reasons, partly shifting conditions among the Allies and the imminence of the Cold War, and said, “At this time, the Brits had enough problems with the Jews.” He was referring to unrest between Jews and Arabs in Palestine, then a League of Nations mandate under British control.

The director Alfred Hitchcock was recruited for the film. The documentary includes a recording of an interview with him about this project. While he worked on it a short time, commentators believe that he strongly influenced its shape and expression. This documentary also includes clips of interviews with surviving cameramen who had filmed at the concentration camps after, or during, liberation. It recounts the production of German Concentration Camps Factual Survey, which included the assembling of a team that included "perhaps the best known film editor in London," Stewart McAllister, Hitchcock and Richard Crossman.

Background and production

The footage that first inspired the film came from the soldiers who liberated the Bergen-Belsen concentration camp. The footage became a part of the evidence in the Nuremberg trials. Based on this footage and footage from other camps, the 1945 documentary was initiated by Sidney Bernstein, then with the British Ministry of Information, to document for the German public the crimes of the Nazis at their concentration camps.

Bernstein brought in Richard Crossman to write the film's narration and had Alfred Hitchcock flown over from Hollywood to advise on the structure. After production was initiated and editing was nearly completed, the British government shelved the film without showing it to the public. Questions remain about their reasons for refusing to release it then, whether they suppressed it for political reasons or whether they determined that other projects would be more effective in the de-Nazification process.

Andre Singer, director of Night Will Fall, said in a media interview that, after the war ended in Europe in May 1945, "government priorities shifted [in Britain]. What seemed like a good idea in 1945 became a problem by June and July."  The British needed the German people to rebuild their country, and the film would not have contributed to that. There was also a concern that "it would provoke most sympathy for the Jewish refugees still in the camps after the war [who] wanted to go to Palestine. The British were having problems with nascent Zionism and felt the film would be unhelpful."

Adaptations

Later in 1945, the 22-minute short film Death Mills was produced by Billy Wilder from some of the joint footage for U.S. government authorities. They showed a German version, directed by Hanus Burger, to German audiences in the United States occupation zone in January 1946.

Five of the planned six reels of German Concentration Camps Factual Survey were released in 1984 as Memory of the Camps. It was televised in the U.S. a year later.

Restoration and Night Will Fall
The Imperial War Museum received the footage and script in 1952. In 2008 it started restoration of the 1945 documentary. The work was completed in time for its world debut at the Berlin International Film Festival in early 2014.

Night Will Fall'''s director was introduced to the project by Sally Angel, who worked at the Imperial War Museum, told Andre Singer about the film and its restoration. He became interested in recounting the larger story of how the film had been made, as well as following up with survivors and participants of the time. Angel produced the film with Brett Ratner. The formats of the footage from 1945 includes black and white 35 mm, and color 16 mm film stock. The production companies involved in the film were from Great Britain, Israel, Germany, the United States and Denmark.

Critical reaction
The film received critical acclaim. On Rotten Tomatoes, the film has a rating of 100% based on 23 reviews, with an average rating of 8.13/10. Variety called it a "powerful, must-see documentary." In The Guardian, critic Peter Bradshaw said the film shows "images which I have certainly never seen before. It exposes once again the obscenity of Holocaust denial. This is an extraordinary record. But be warned. Once seen, these images cannot be unseen." The New York Times called it "not a film you’re likely to forget," and that "what the new film accomplishes, more than anything else, is to make you wish you could see the original."

The film's score, composed by Nicholas Singer, was nominated for Best Composition in a Feature Film at the 2015 UK Music and Sound Awards. The film won the Royal Television Society award for History in 2016, where it was cited as "A landmark film, an affirmation of the importance of television as a medium of truth and a document of record in itself." It also won a Peabody Award in New York in April 2016.

ScreeningsNight Will Fall was broadcast in the UK on Channel 4 on 24 January 2015 as a single continuous programme, without any commercial breaks. It aired on major networks around the world during the week of 27 January, Holocaust Remembrance Day and the 70th anniversary of the liberation of Auschwitz.Carole Horst, Holocaust Doc ‘Night Will Fall’ Gets Global Broadcast, Variety, 21 November 2014. It was broadcast by Swedish television SVT on 26 January 2015, also by NRK three times in January 2015, and by HBO in the United States.

 Awards 
 The Royal Television Society Award for History
 The George Foster Peabody Award
 National Academy of Television Arts & Sciences Emmy for Outstanding Historical Programming: Long Form
 FOCAL Award for best use of archive in a Cinema Release
 FOCAL Award for best use of archive in a History Production
 Moscow Jewish Film Festival

 References 

External links
 
 German Concentration Camps Factual Survey'' at the Imperial War Museum
 

Documentary films about the Holocaust
2014 films
2014 documentary films